Sergio Vincenzo Roberto Padt (born 6 June 1990) is a Dutch footballer who plays as a goalkeeper for Ludogorets Razgrad. Padt previously played on loan from AFC Ajax for HFC Haarlem in the Eerste Divisie, and later for Go Ahead Eagles and in the Belgian Pro League for Gent. He represented the Netherlands U-17 team at the 2007 UEFA European Under-17 Football Championship.

He is of Italian descent.

Club career

AFC Ajax
Prior to joining Ajax, Padt played for R.K.S.V. Pancratius and SV Hoofddorp. On 28 March 2008, he signed his first contract for Ajax.

HFC Haarlem
In early 2010, Padt was sent out on loan to Eerste Divisie side HFC Haarlem to gain more experience. He made his debut on 22 January 2010 in a 0–3 away loss to SBV Excelsior. It would turn out to be his only match for Haarlem because the club soon afterward went into bankruptcy, meaning he had to return to Ajax for the remainder of the 2009–10 season.

Go Ahead Eagles
For the 2010–11 season, Padt signed a new contract with Ajax and was again sent out on loan, this time to Go Ahead Eagles. On 16 August 2010, he made his Eerste Divisie debut for the club in the first league match against Sparta Rotterdam. Padt became the first keeper at his start in Deventer.

KAA Gent
On 30 June 2011, Padt came to an agreement with AA Gent, and on 6 July, the transfer was completed. He signed his contract until 2013 on that day. On 27 November 2011, he made his official debut in the Belgian Pro League for Gent in the 2–0 victory against RC Genk.

Groningen
On 22 June 2014, it was announced that Padt would sign a deal with FC Groningen. He helped the Green-White Army win the KNVB Cup in 2014/15 against defending champions PEC Zwolle. It was their first major trophy and they qualified for the UEFA Europa League.

Ludogorets Razgrad
In early 2021, it was reported that he had signed a pre-contract with the Bulgarian champions Ludogorets Razgrad and joined the club officially on 2 June 2021.

International career
Padt represented the Netherlands U-17 team at the 2007 UEFA European Under-17 Football Championship. Padt was in the starting line-up for all three group games against Belgium, Iceland, and England, but the team failed to qualify for the second round.

Since 2009, Padt has been playing for the Netherlands U-21 team, although Tim Krul is first-choice keeper in the squad for now. He received his first call-up from manager Cor Pot for a 2011 European U-21 Championship qualification match against Finland. On 18 May 2010, Padt made his debut for the U-21 side in a match against Portugal.

He was called up to the senior Netherlands squad for friendlies against Slovakia and Italy in May 2018, but remained on the bench for both matches.

Train incident
On 23 September 2018, Padt was arrested on a train after attacking two Arriva employees. He did not have a valid ticket with him and was about to be issued a fine. Padt disagreed with this decision and sparked an altercation, which then led to his arrest. He spent a night in jail and was released on the afternoon of Monday, 24 September. The day after the incident, Padt handed his captain's armband over to defender Mike te Wierik, who took over as captain from that moment on. Despite the incident, Padt kept his spot in the FC Groningen starting eleven, but he was not called up for international duty by the Dutch national team.

Career statistics

Club

Honours

Club
Groningen
KNVB Cup (1): 2014–15

Ludogorets Razgrad
Bulgarian First League: 2021–22
Bulgarian Supercup: 2022

References

External links
 
 Voetbal International profile 

1990 births
Living people
Footballers from Haarlem
Association football goalkeepers
Dutch footballers
Netherlands youth international footballers
Netherlands under-21 international footballers
AFC Ajax players
HFC Haarlem players
Go Ahead Eagles players
K.A.A. Gent players
FC Groningen players
PFC Ludogorets Razgrad players
Eredivisie players
Eerste Divisie players
Belgian Pro League players
First Professional Football League (Bulgaria) players
Dutch expatriate footballers
Expatriate footballers in Belgium
Expatriate footballers in Bulgaria
Dutch expatriate sportspeople in Belgium
Dutch expatriate sportspeople in Bulgaria
Dutch people of Italian descent